Bisheshwar Prasad Koirala formed the first elected government of Nepal on 27 May 1959. After the 1951 democratic movement, several transitional governments failed to hold the first general elections in the country until an interim government under Subarna SJB Rana held the 1959 general elections in two phases on 18 February and 3 April 1959. Nepali Congress gained a majority in the 1st House of Representatives of Nepal and Bishweshwar Prasad Koirala was elected as the parliamentary party leader of the Nepali Congress on 4 May 1959. On 16 May 1959, Koirala was invited by King Mahendra to form a government and the cabinet was formed on 27 May 1959  The cabinet was reshuffled just over a  month later on 30 June 1959.

Koirala and the entire cabinet were arrested and the parliament was dissolved in 15 December 1960 as a result of a coup d'état by King Mahendra.

Cabinets

May–June 1959

June 1959–December 1960

References 

1959 in Nepal
Cabinet of Nepal
Cabinets established in 1959
Cabinets disestablished in 1960
1959 establishments in Nepal
1960 disestablishments in Nepal